Paxino da Nova was an Italian painter of the second half of the 14th century active in Bergamo.

Biography
He was born in Bergamo. He painted in nave of Santa Maria Maggiore in Bergamo. Among his pupils was Bartolomeo, son of Isnardo De Goldi.

References

Year of birth unknown
Year of death unknown
14th-century Italian painters
Italian male painters
Painters from Bergamo